St. Paul's Episcopal Church is a historic Episcopal church at 26 S. Madison Avenue in Spring Valley, Rockland County, New York.  It was built in 1872 and is a frame Gothic Revival style parish church.

It was listed on the National Register of Historic Places in 2008.

References

Episcopal church buildings in New York (state)
Churches on the National Register of Historic Places in New York (state)
Churches completed in 1872
19th-century Episcopal church buildings
Churches in Rockland County, New York
Ramapos
National Register of Historic Places in Rockland County, New York